Sayyad-e Shirazi Metro Station is a station of Mashhad Metro Line 1. The station opened on 10 October 2011. It is located on Vakilabad Expressway.

It is named after the assassinated Ali Sayad Shirazi, chief-of-staff of the Iranian Armed Forces during the eight-year Iran–Iraq war.

References

Mashhad Metro stations
Railway stations opened in 2011
2011 establishments in Iran